The Moving Frontier is an album by Pram, released in 2007.

Critical reception
AllMusic wrote that "exotica, '60s and '70s electronic novelty pop, and noir-ish jazz are still major influences on Pram's music, and on their instrumentals they mimic and modernize those sounds like few other bands can." NME deemed the album "45 minutes of bland, jazzy, nonsense." Clash thought that Pram had become "immersed in overtly odd, bloated high-art plodding."

Track listing
'The Empty Quarter'
'Salt and Sand'
'Iske'
'The City Surveyor'
'Sundew'
'Salva'
'Moonminer'
'Hums Around Us'
'Metaluna'
'Beluga'
'Blind Tiger'
'Mariana Deep'
'Compass Rose'
'The Silk Road'

Personnel 
Rosie Cuckston – vocals, keyboards, omnichord
Matt Eaton - guitar, bass guitar, sampler, keyboards
Sam Owen –  bass guitar, guitar, keyboards, accordion, woodwind
Max Simpson – keyboards, sampler
Laurence Hunt – drums, percussion
Harry Dawes – trumpet, trombone
Natalie Mason – viola
Grandmaster Gareth – cello, string arrangements

References

2007 albums
Pram (band) albums